David M. Maddox (born April 5, 1938) is a retired United States Army four-star general who served as Commander in Chief, United States Army Europe/Commander, Central Army Group from 1992 to 1993 and Commander in Chief, United States Army Europe from 1993 to 1994. He commanded the 2nd Armored Cavalry Regiment from 1981 to 1983. He is a 1960 graduate of Virginia Military Institute. He received his Master of Science in Applied Science (Operations Research) from Southern Illinois University in 1969.

Maddox spent much of his time towards the end of his career transitioning the army in Europe to a post-Cold War stance. After retiring from the army, Maddox has worked as an independent consultant to industry and the government. He has also served on the Defense Science Board, is a Senior Fellow of the Army Science Board, and a member of the Washington Institute of Foreign Affairs. He was also elected a member of the National Academy of Engineering in 2004 for contributions to making operations research an integral part of U.S. Army planning and operations at all levels.

In October 2007, Maddox was part of a six-member panel appointed by Secretary of the Army Pete Geren that issued a report critical of the Pentagon's procedures for appointing and supervising contracting officers. He served as a member of the Department of the Army 120-day study, commissioned by Secretary of the Army John McHugh, to examine its acquisition organizations, policies, workforce and processes, including how it acquires and handles equipment.

Maddox received the Military Operations Research Society's Wanner Award for outstanding contributions to the progress of this advanced profession, the Institute for Operations Research and the Management Sciences' J. Steinhardt prize for lifetime contributions to the practical applications of OR techniques for the solution of military problems,  and is a member of the Army Operations Research Society Hall of Fame.

Awards and decorations

References

External links
Vance R. Wanner Memorial Award bio
National Academy of Engineering Elects 76 Members and 11 Foreign Associates
INFORMS J. Steinhard prize for lifetime service.
VMI Army Hall of Fame

1938 births
Living people
United States Army generals
Virginia Military Institute alumni
Recipients of the Legion of Merit
Recipients of the Distinguished Service Medal (US Army)
United States Army personnel of the Vietnam War
Military personnel from Chicago
Members of the United States National Academy of Engineering